Udo Schaefer (October 19, 1926 – August 30, 2019) was a German lawyer and a theologian of the Baháʼí Faith.

Publications

References

External links
http://www.udoschaefer.com
English Books
English articles

1926 births
2019 deaths
German Bahá'ís
20th-century Bahá'ís
21st-century Bahá'ís
Religious apologists
20th-century German lawyers